Asian Highway 34 (AH34) is an east–west route of the Asian Highway Network, running 1,033 km (642 miles) from Lianyungang, China, through four provinces: Jiangsu, Anhui, Henan, Shaanxi, ending at  in Xi'an, Shaanxi.

China 
  G30 Expressway: Lianyungang - Zhengzhou - Xi'an.

Junctions
  Zhengzhou
  Xi'an

References

External links
 Treaty on Asian Highways with routes

Asian Highway Network
Roads in China